The 2nd Shanghai International Film Festival was held between October 28 and November 12, 1995. The festival marked the 90 year anniversary of the first ever Chinese film, 1905's Dingjun Mountain. 232 films from 46 countries participated in the Festival, 19 of which were officially selections for competition. Swiss director Wolfgang Panzer's Broken Silence won the Golden Goblet for best film.

Jury
Sun Daolin (China)
Lee Hsing (Taiwan)
Jacqueline Andere (Mexico)
Jean Becker (France)
Krzysztof Zanussi (Poland)
Manfred Durniok (Germany)
Stanislav Rostotsky (Russia)

In competition

Awards

Golden Goblet
Best Film - Broken Silence (dir. Wolfgang Panzer, Switzerland)
Best Director - Erik Clausen for Carl, My Childhood Symphony (Denmark)
Best Actor - Jean-Pierre Marielle for Les Milles (France)
Best Actress - Guo Keyu for Red Cherry (China)

Special Jury Award
House of Fire (dir. Juan Bautista Stagnaro, Argentina)
American Daughter (dir. Karen Shakhnazarov, Russia)

References

External links
Archives of the Shanghai International Film Festival
2nd SIFF at the Internet Movie Database

Shanghai International Film Festival, 1995
Shanghai International Film Festival, 1995
Shanghai International Film Festival
1990s in Shanghai